Rashid or Rachid and Rasheed, which means "rightly guided", may refer to:

Rashid (name), also Rachid and Rasheed, people with the given name or surname
Rached, a given name and surname
Rashad, a surname

Places
Rachid, Mauritania, a town at the foot of the Tagant Plateau
Rashid, Iran, a village in Khuzestan Province
Rashid, Yemen, a village
Rashid, alternate name of Tang-e Goraz, Iran
Rosetta, anglicized name of the city and port of Rashid in Egypt

Characters
Rashid (Street Fighter), a character in the Street Fighter universe
Rashid Saluja, a character in the Magi universe

Other uses
Egyptian frigate Rasheed
Rashid (lunar rover), a United Arab Emirates rover planned to land on the moon in 2024
Rashidi dynasty, an Arabian dynasty from 1836 to 1921
Rasheed Air Base, an Iraqi Air Force base on the outskirts of Baghdad, Iraq
Rasheed Bank, the second largest bank in Iraq
Rasheed Carbine, an Egyptian semiautomatic rifle
Rasheed Wallace, an American former professional basketball player

See also
Al-Rashid (disambiguation), also ar-Rashid, Al-Rasheed and other spelling variations